Jammalamadaka is a village in the Macherla mandal in the Palnadu district of Andhra Pradesh in India. It is located towards west from District headquarters.

Villages in Palnadu district